Marion C. Pugh (September 6, 1919 – November 20, 1976) was an American football quarterback who played two seasons with the New York Giants of the National Football League. He was drafted by the Philadelphia Eagles in the third round of the 1941 NFL Draft. He played college football and baseball at Texas A&M University. Pugh attended North Side High School in Fort Worth, Texas. He was also a member of the Miami Seahawks of the All-America Football Conference. He died of a heart attack on November 20, 1976. He served in World War II for the United States Army before rejoining the Giants in 1945.

References

External links
Just Sports Stats
College stats

1919 births
1976 deaths
Players of American football from Fort Worth, Texas
American football quarterbacks
Texas A&M Aggies football players
Texas A&M Aggies baseball players
New York Giants players
Miami Seahawks players
United States Army personnel of World War II
United States Army officers
Military personnel from Texas